TVP3 Wrocław is one of the regional branches of the TVP, Poland's public television broadcaster. It serves the entire Lower Silesian Voivodeship.

External links 
Official website

Telewizja Polska
Television channels and stations established in 1962
Mass media in Wrocław